RLW is the abbreviation for two different rugby league magazines, one in the UK and the other in Australia:

 Rugby League Week, an Australian publication
 Rugby League World, a British publication

In science and engineering
 Regularized long-wave equation, a model for surface gravity waves which are long and propagate unidirectionally

Other
 Ricochet Lost Worlds, a video game
 Ricochet Lost Worlds: Recharged, a video game sequel